Petar Vutsov (born 7 August 2000) is a Bulgarian professional footballer who plays as a midfielder for Sportist Svoge.

He comes from a footballing family, with his grandfather Ivan, father Velislav, mother Svetlana and brother Svetoslav having all played professional football.

Career
Vutsov made his first team debut for Cherno More in a 3–2 away loss against Slavia Sofia on 19 February 2019, coming on as a substitute for Patrick Andrade.

References

External links
 

Living people
2000 births
Bulgarian footballers
PFC Cherno More Varna players
PFC Spartak Pleven players
OFC Pirin Blagoevgrad players
First Professional Football League (Bulgaria) players
Second Professional Football League (Bulgaria) players
Association football midfielders